Douglas Rosenberg (born December 12, 1957) is a business leader based in the San Francisco Bay Area.

Rosenberg is an active investor and entrepreneur involved in a broad range of businesses. Most notable is Royal Emerald Pharmaceuticals, a disabled veteran-owned company dedicated to creating compounds and formulations that address conditions like PTSD, opioid addiction, pain, and anxiety, to name a few. From October 2014 to September 2017, Rosenberg was chairman of Midwestern Bio Ag based in Madison, Wisconsin. He led successful capital campaigns to support the company’s ambitious growth plans.

Rosenberg founded and actively managed the Rosenberg Alzheimer's Project from 2007 to 2014. He began focusing on Alzheimer's disease as his father and step-parents died from complications of the disease. Frustrated by research and development proposals that began to sound familiar, he embraced an outsider approach, looking for the most credible scientists with alternative views of the disease.

Past grants supported the work of scientists pursuing novel therapies and those working to reduce the cost and time involved in developing potential cures.  In early 2011, the Project invested $3.5 million in the Buck Institute for Research on Aging, partnering with Dale Bredesen to examine alternative compounds to treat Alzheimer's disease.

He holds a political science degree from Lewis & Clark College. He lives in Marin County.

References

External links 
 Rosenberg Alzheimer's Project

Philanthropists from California
People from Kentfield, California
1957 births
Living people